Winter wind, winds of winter, or variation, may refer to:

 Winter Wind (classical music), Étude Op. 25, No. 11 by Chopin
 Winter Winds, 2002 album by Mickey Newbury
 "Winter Winds", 2009 single by Mumford & Sons
 "Winterwind", song off the 2010 LP Blood Under the Bridge by Bottomless Pit
 Die winterwind (poem), a poem by Sydney Vernon Petersen
 The Winds of Winter (novel), a novel in the A Song of Ice and Fire epic fantasy saga by George R.R. Martin
 The Winds of Winter (episode), a 2016 TV episode of epic fantasy TV series Game of Thrones
 Winterwind (ship), a U.S. fishing boat, see List of shipwrecks in 1981

See also
 Wind (disambiguation)
 Winter (disambiguation)
 Winter wind-flower (Anemone blanda), a flower
 That Winter, the Wind Blows (TV series) 2013 South Korean romantic melodrama
 North wind (disambiguation)